The  was a class of ocean liners of Japan, serving during 1940 and World War II.

Background

 17 May 1937, the  placed an order for three ocean liners to reinforce the Japan-Africa route. They were named Hōkoku Maru, Aikoku Maru and Kōkoku Maru (later renamed Gokoku Maru).
 They were beautiful, and luxuriously equipped Their suites were named after ancient Japanese cities:

Civilian service
 Hōkoku Maru was completed on 15 June 1940. Her maiden voyage was 2–12 July 1940, Yokohama-Dalian.
 On 17 July 1940, she departed to South America on her only overseas voyage. After this she stayed close to the Japanese mainland, as the Imperial Japanese Navy (IJN) feared losing her.
 Aikoku Maru was completed on 31 August 1941.
 In September 1941, both ships were enlisted by the IJN.

Service in World War II
 Hōkoku Maru and Aikoku Maru became auxiliary cruisers, and they were assigned to the 24th Raider Division, Combined Fleet. When they learned of the outbreak of war they were north of Tuamotus.
 27 April 1942, Aikoku Maru supported submarine I-30 which departed to Germany. 
 4 August 1942, Gokoku Maru was completed. She acted in the Indian Ocean until 30 November 1942.
 11 November 1942, Hōkoku Maru was sunk by HMIS Bengal and tanker Ondina in the Indian Ocean. Aikoku Maru returned to Singapore.
 January 1943, Aikoku Maru and Gokoku Maru were dispatched to New Guinea They engaged in troop transportation duties afterward.
 1 October 1943, they were classified to Auxiliary transport, and removed some armaments.
 17 February 1944, Aikoku Maru was sunk by air raid at Chuuk.
 10 November 1944, Gokoku Maru was sunk by a US submarine.

Photos

Footnotes

Bibliography

 Tashirō Iwashige, The visual guide of Japanese wartime merchant marine,  (Japan), May 2009
 Hisashi Noma (private publication), The Story of Mitsui and O.S.K. Liners lost during the Pacific War, May 2002
Monthly Ships of the World No.535, (Japan), February 1998
 The Maru Special, Japanese Naval Vessels No.53, "Japanese support vessels",  (Japan), July 1981

Ocean liner classes
World War II naval ships of Japan
Ships built by Mitsui Engineering and Shipbuilding